Bailando 2012 was the eighth Argentinean season of Bailando por un Sueño. The first show of the season aired on 11 June 2012 on El Trece, with Marcelo Tinelli as host and 30 couples competing.

The jury were Carmen Barbieri, Anibal Pachano, Antonio Gasalla, Moria Casán, Flavio Mendoza and Marcelo Polino.
Though Gasalla had been a guest judge in season 5, this was his first time as a permanent judge; however, he left the show in round 10. Santiago Bal was also confirmed as a judge, but he recused himself before the beginning of the show at the request of his son, Federico Bal, who was a contestant.

This was the first season to feature three disabled contestants: Noelia Pompa (dwarfism), Ayelén Barreiro (Down syndrome) and Reinaldo Ojeda (leg amputee). Verónica Perdomo is also a special case, as she is a cerebrovascular disease survivor.

Noelia Pompa and Hernán Piquín won for the second year in a row.

Couples 

 Sergio "Maravilla" Martínez left the competition, and Alexander Caniggia entered in his place.
 Valeria Archimó left the competition, and Adabel Guerrero entered in her place.
 Liz Solari left the competition, and Karina Jelinek entered in her place.
 Karina Jelinek left the competition, and Alexandra Larsson entered in her place.

Scoring chart 

Red numbers indicate the lowest score for each week.
Green numbers indicate the highest score for each week.
 indicates the couple eliminated that week.
 indicates the couple was saved by the public.
 indicates the couple was saved by the jury.
 indicates the couple withdrew.
 indicates the winning couple.
 indicates the runner-up couple.
 indicates the semifinalists couples.

From the round 7 Valeria Archimó was replaced by Adabel Guerrero.
From the round 18 Paula Chaves was replaced by Vanesa García Millán.
In round 7, Charlotte Caniggia was sentenced because she stopped her routines in the middle of the choreography.
In round 17, Paula & Peter were sentenced since they weren't able to dance due Paula's lesion.
In round 18, Peter & Vanessa couldn't finish their choreography because Peter was injured in the middle of the choreography.
In round 18, Florencia Peña was sentenced because she stopped her routine in the middle of the choreography.
 replaced by Silvina Escudero.
 Valeria Archimó was replaced by Adabel Guerrero.
 Ayelén Barreiro was replaced by Karina Jelinek.
 Adabel Guerrero was replaced by Belén Francese.
 Paula Chaves was replaced by Karina Jelinek.
 replaced by Cinthia Fernández.
 replaced by Tito Speranza.
 replaced by Karina Jelinek.
 replaced by Lolo Rossi.

Highest and lowest scoring performances 
The best and worst performances in each dance according to the judges' marks are as follows:

Styles, scores and songs 
Secret vote is in bold text.

June

July

August

September

October

November

December

Duel

Semifinal and Final 

 replaced by Lolo Rossi.
 replaced by Hugo Ávila.
 replaced by Ricardo Fort.
 replaced by Silvina Escudero.
 replaced by Chiche Gelblung.
 replaced by Santiago Bal.
 replaced by Reina Reech.
 replaced by Eleonora Cassano.
 replaced by Laura Fidalgo.
 replaced by Jean François Casanovas.

References 

Argentina
Argentine variety television shows
2012 Argentine television seasons